Moranlı or Moranly or Muranly may refer to:
Moranlı, Jalilabad, Azerbaijan
Moranlı, Sabirabad, Azerbaijan